is a Japanese actress known especially for her roles in Nikkatsu's Roman Porno series of films in the early 1980s.

Life and career
Kazama was born in Nagasaki Prefecture, Japan on May 25, 1956. She began her acting career at least as early as December 1979 with the Shintōhō Eiga pink film  directed by Kaoru Umezawa. During the first half of 1980 she made several more pink films for Shintōhō Eiga, Million Film and other studios including , directed by Itsumichi Isomura and co-starring Shirō Shimomoto released by Shintōhō Eiga in March 1980.

She appeared in her first film for Nikkatsu in July 1980, the Roman Porno release  directed by Shōgorō Nishimura. Pink film critics Thomas & Yuko Mihara Weisser credit Nishimura, who wrote and directed several of her features, with discovering and nurturing Kazama as a Nikkatsu actress and claim that though not a beautiful woman, she "smells of sex." Two months after this film, Nishimura directed Kazama in a vehicle suited to her talents in an attempt to give Nikkatsu a new star to replace Naomi Tani who had retired in 1979. The film, was the first of the four-part "Woman Who ..." series all starring Kazama. The second film in the series, directed by Akira Katō, was released in November 1980. The third entry in the series Woman Who Exposes Herself came out in January 1981. Kazama's acting in this film won her the award for Best Actress at the 3rd Yokohama Film Festival. The final film in the series, the June 1981 , was directed by Masaru Konuma, who had also directed Woman Who Exposes Herself. The Weissers comment that throughout the series "Kazama's acting ability always shines through."

By this time, according to the Weissers, Kazama had become Nikkatsu's "biggest actress of the '80s." In September 1981, Kazama was paired with Nikkatsu director Takashi Sugano in another film tailor-made for her, where she plays a sexually aggressive woman who finds ecstasy in witnessing a murder. The Weissers consider this film and the earlier Poaching Wife: Frustrated Inside to be two of her best efforts. The Japanese Movie Database lists the July 1982 release  as Kazama's last film for Nikkatsu, a movie in which she plays only a minor role.

Kazama also had small parts in two 1982 mainstream movies, Tattoo Ari and Weekend Shuffle. In April 1987, Kazama married comedian Susumu Kimura and settled in Osaka.

Filmography
   (Dec. 1979, Shintōhō Eiga)
 ' (Mar. 1980, Shintōhō Eiga)
  (July 1980, Nikkatsu)
  (Sept. 1980, Nikkatsu)
  (Nov. 1980, Nikkatsu)
 Woman Who Exposes Herself (Jan. 1981, Nikkatsu)
  (Mar. 1981, Nikkatsu)
  (May 1981, Nikkatsu)
  (June 1981, Nikkatsu)
  (Sept. 1981, Nikkatsu)
  (Nov. 1981, Nikkatsu)
  (Dec. 1981, Nikkatsu)
  (Feb. 1982, Nikkatsu)
  (Feb. 1982, Nikkatsu)
  (Apr. 1982, Nikkatsu)
  (June 1982, Takahashi Prod.)
  (July 1982, Nikkatsu)
  (Oct. 1982, Joypack)

References

External links

1956 births
Living people
Japanese film actresses